The Pakistan women's national boxing team represents Pakistan in international boxing competitions. It is administered by the Pakistan Boxing Federation (PBF). The team competed internationally for the first time at the South Asian Games held in Guwahati, India in 2016. It debuted at the continental level at the Asian Games held in Jakarta, Indonesia in 2018.

History
For the first time, Pakistan send its boxing team to an international competition in 2016. A three-member team; Khoushleem, Rukhsana Parveen and Sofia Javed, competed at the South Asian Games in Guwahati, India in 2016. They returned home with two bronze medals in 60 kg and 75 kg weight categories. In 2018, the team debut at the Asia Games held in Jakarta, Indonesia where it sent a two-member team. The team competed at the  South Asian Games held in Kathmandu, Nepal in 2019 where it won three bronze medals.

Members

Medals

References

Women's national team
Boxing
Women's sport in Pakistan